Buchanan & Press is an American debate show on MSNBC pairing former Crossfire hosts conservative Pat Buchanan and liberal Bill Press. The show was cancelled due to both hosts' opposition to the 2003 Iraq War.

References

External links
 MSNBC Is Clearing Out a Slot in Prime Time
 

2000s American television news shows
2002 American television series debuts
2003 American television series endings
MSNBC original programming
English-language television shows
Debate television series
Pat Buchanan